Gokul Suresh (born 29 September 1993) is an Indian actor who appears in Malayalam films. He is the son of film actor and politician Suresh Gopi. He graduated with a bachelor's degree in Business Administration from Christ University, Bengaluru and did internship at Le Méridien, Kochi before entering into cinema. In 2016, he made his acting debut with the romantic comedy Mudhugauv, which earned him a SIIMA Award for Best Debut Actor nomination.

Early life

Gokul was born as the eldest son to Malayalam actor and former Rajya Sabha MP Suresh Gopi and Radhika Nair on 29 September 1993 in Thiruvananthapuram, Kerala. He has two younger sisters Bhagya Suresh, Bhaavni Suresh and a younger brother Madhav Suresh. Gokul completed his primary level education from St. Thomas Residential School, Thiruvananthapuram and his secondary level education from Pallikoodam School, Kottayam and Saraswathy Vidyalaya, Thiruvananthapuram.

He graduated with a bachelor's degree in Business Administration from Christ University in Bangalore, and did his internship as a front officer and staff at Le Méridien, Kochi. It was during this time he felt a passion for acting and lost interest in corporate jobs. In Gokul's debut film Mudhugauv, Aju Varghese was initially cast to play the lead role. But the makers wanted a younger actor to make the character look more convincing. While in search of a younger actor they ended up in Gokul who happened to be producer Sandra Thomas' Facebook friend and then approached him with the script. Gokul found the script for Mudhugauv interesting and later replaced Aju.

Career

Acting debut (20162017)
Gokul had made his debut into acting with the 2016 film Mudhugauv directed by debutant Vipin Das. The movie was a production of Vijay Babu and Sandra Thomas' Friday Film House. He played Bharath, an absentminded college student whose only intention was for his love interest, Ganga. In a typical mixed review, Sanjith Sidhardhan of The Times of India rated Gokul's performance as "it has only helped the actor as he has a sweet and appealing presence", while Anasuya Menon of The Hindu said: "Gokul Suresh’s impressive debut in Muddhugauv has clearly set him on track".

In his second venture, he did a supporting character in director Ajai Vasudev's Masterpiece (2017) starring Mammootty. Gokul played a college student Unnikrishnan who is alleged murdering his love interest. Writing for The Times of India, Deepa Soman commended: "Though brief, Gokul Suresh enacts his role decently enough and the makers have tried to ooze as much energy as possible into the song sequences". "Mammootty sir was the reason why I chose Masterpiece. I didn't care whether the character was a long one or a sidekick," said Gokul.

As an actor, Gokul wants to follow Fahadh Faasil's path of career growth and likes Fahadh's perspective on certain aspects. He said to The Times of India, "I watch the interviews of all the actors, but I could personally relate to what Fahadh says".

2018present

In 2018, he acted in Ira, the first combined production of director Vysakh and writer Udaykrishna. He played the lead role alongside Unni Mukundan. Anna M. M. Vetticad of Firstpost called him "suitably sweet" mentioning "which is all he needs to be here". After the release of the film he had revealed that there were attempts to sideline him as the shooting of his films got delayed. But he believed that if someone is talented nobody can stop him or her from reaching the goal.

In early 2019, he played a cameo role as Saghavu Franci alongside Pranav Mohanlal in Arun Gopy's Irupathiyonnaam Noottaandu. His performance earned him positive reviews from critics; Litty Simon of Malayala Manorama said, "Gokul Suresh as Saghavu Franci makes a cameo appearance but definitely leaves an impression". "I have only had four releases till date and yet the most satisfying one was Irupathiyonnaam Noottaandu, which did not even have me as the lead. Though it was just a cameo, the way my character was presented by director Arun Gopy chettan was brilliant. I believe how your character is showcased has a massive impact on how the audience feel about you as an actor" he said.

Gokul next appeared alongside Niranj Maniyanpilla Raju and Varsha Bollamma in Anil Rraj's family-thriller Soothrakkaran (2019). He plays Madathil Aravindan, who helps his father in running a milk products export and import company. Upon release, the film received negative review from critics and Deepika Jayaram of The Times of India thought Gokul's performance in the film reminded "many of his father’s aura and swag" and notes that "he manages to keep his poise, even when he exhibits shades of grey". He was also seen acting an extended cameo role alongside Guinness Pakru in Madhav Ramadasan's Ilayaraja. He then acted in writer turned director Suresh Poduval's Ulta with Prayaga Martin as his heroine.

Upcoming projects

Currently he has completed shooting for debutant director Arun Chandu'sSayanna Varthakal. In February 2019, he reportedly signed his next movie, an untitled Tamil-Malayalam bilingual film directed by M. Padmakumar which also has actors Vidharth and Samuthirakani playing important roles. On 9 March 2019, The Times of India reported that Gokul will be playing as Kochu Chackochi in the sequel to the 1997 film Lelam which starred his father Suresh Gopi in the lead. The film titled Lelam 2 will be directed by Nithin Renji Panicker and written by his father Renji Panicker.

Filmography

Awards and nominations

References

External links 

 
 

1993 births
Living people
Indian male film actors
Male actors in Malayalam cinema
21st-century Indian male actors
Male actors from Thiruvananthapuram
Male actors from Kochi
Film people from Kerala
Indian Hindus
Malayali people
Christ University alumni